Siliguri College of Commerce, established in 1962, is one of the commerce colleges in Siliguri. It offers undergraduate courses in commerce. It is affiliated to  University of North Bengal.

Departments

Accountancy
Business Administration
Management

Accreditation

In 2004 the college has been awarded C grade by the National Assessment and Accreditation Council (NAAC). The college is recognized by the University Grants Commission (UGC).

Notable alumni

Ashok Bhattacharya,  politician, minister, Government of West Bengal
Wriddhiman Saha, Indian cricket player

See also

References

External links
Siliguri College of Commerce
University of North Bengal
University Grants Commission
National Assessment and Accreditation Council

Commerce colleges in India
Universities and colleges in Darjeeling district
Colleges affiliated to University of North Bengal
Education in Siliguri
Educational institutions established in 1971
1971 establishments in West Bengal